The Yaeyama class is the largest class of Japan Maritime Self-Defense Force minesweepers, designed for open-sea mine clearance operations. Three ships were built in the class, a further three ships were planned but were cancelled. The ships use wooden hulls to reduce their magnetic signature and is one of the largest-sized wooden hull ships designed today.

Jane's Fighting Ships notes their similarity to the U.S. Avenger-class minesweepers.

Design
The forecastle was stretched to more than 3/4 of the total length to suppress the increase of retention and member dimensions of the longitudinal strength.

In order to cope with an increase in shear stress accompanying the enlargement of the ship and thickness increase, the outer plate structure has a three layer double arrow blade structure in which the inner layer plates are inclined at right angles to each other and a vertical laminate of the outer layer is stretched to this It is said. In the case of adopting the same double arrow blade structure as the conventional minesweeping boat, it was thought that the inner layer board thickness became 47 mm, but it is suppressed to 20 mm by this.

The use of various tree species, seen in the list below, is the same as the Uwajima-class minesweepers.

Douglas fir - keel skeg, bottom stringer, chine material, frame, the outer plate-deck
Keyaki - Kiel friction material
Oleaceae - plywood

The main engine is equipped with Mitsubishi Heavy Industries 4-cycle non-magnetic diesel engines of the same design as in the Uwajimas but with a larger output (1,200 hp / 1,000 Rpm) mounted via a double anti-vibration device. It is the first minesweeper in the Japanese navy to feature a bow thruster, GPS equipped with a precision navigation equipment and automatic Sokan apparatus in order to improve the ship's ability to hold position.

Ships in the class

Comparable ships
Avenger class minesweepers

References

 Minesweeper Division 51 (see above)
 Mine warfare force JMSDF (Japanese, Official)
 Jane's Fighting Ships 2005–2006

External links

Minesweeper Division 51 (Japanese, Official)

 
Minesweepers of the Japan Maritime Self-Defense Force
Mine warfare vessel classes